The 2017 Torneo Descentralizado de Fútbol Profesional (known as the 2017 Copa Movistar for sponsorship reasons) was the 101st season of the highest division of Peruvian football. A total of 16 teams competed in the season. Alianza Lima were the champions.

Competition modus
The season was divided into four phases, Torneo de Verano, Torneo Apertura, Torneo Clausura, and the Play-offs final. 

The first phase was the Torneo de Verano where all the teams were divided into two groups and played each team in their group twice at home and away. The winner of each group qualified to a double-legged, home-and-away final. The group winner with the most points in the aggregate table chose which leg they played as the home team. The winner of this tournament earned access to the second round of the 2018 Copa Libertadores as long as it was not relegated at the end of the season. If the Torneo de Verano champion was to also win either the Apertura or Clausura tournaments then the runner-up would take their Copa Libertadores berth.

The second and third stages were two smaller Apertura and Clausura tournaments of 15 games each. Each team played all other teams once during the Apertura tournament and once during the Clausura tournament in reversed order for a total of 30 matches. Points earned during the Apertura did not carry over during the Clausura. The winners of the Apertura and Clausura stages were to qualify to the Playoff final and to the 2018 Copa Libertadores group stage as long as they were not relegated at the end of the season.

The playoffs were to be contested by the Apertura and Clausura champions. The team with the most points on the aggregate table would choose which leg they would play as the home team. If teams were tied in points, a third match on neutral ground would be played to decide the national champion. If a team won both the Apertura and Clausura tournaments, then it would be automatically declared the tournament champion and the runners-up from the Apertura and Clausura tournaments would play two play-off matches to decide which team would enter the 2018 Copa Libertadores group stage. The two teams with the fewest points at the end of the third stage were relegated. The berth to the Copa Libertadores first stage and the four 2018 Copa Sudamericana berths were awarded to the teams with the best record in the aggregate table that had not qualified for the Copa Libertadores.

Teams
A total of 16 teams played in the 2017 Torneo Descentralizado. Fourteen teams from the previous season, plus the 2016 Segunda División champion (Cantolao) and the 2016 Copa Perú champion (Sport Rosario).

Stadia and locations

Torneo de Verano

Group A

Group B

Finals
The champion will be the one with the most points after the two legs are played. In case they are tie on points, the team with the best goal different over the two legs will be declared the champion. The away goal rule will not apply. In case both teams score the same number of goals, there will be 30 minutes of extra time and penalties.

Melgar defeated UTC 4–3 on penalties after being tied on aggregate and secured a spot in the 2018 Copa Libertadores second stage.

Torneo Apertura

Standings

Results

Torneo Clausura

Standings

Results

Playoffs
As Alianza Lima and Real Garcilaso finished both as champions and runners-up of the Apertura and Clausura tournaments, no playoff games were played. Alianza Lima were the overall champions and Real Garcilaso were the overall runners-up, and both teams qualified for the 2018 Copa Libertadores group stage.

Aggregate table
All stages (Torneo de Verano, Torneo Apertura, and Torneo Clausura) of the 2017 season were aggregated into a single league table throughout the season to determine the teams that would qualify for the Copa Libertadores and Copa Sudamericana, as well as those to be relegated at the end of the season.

See also
 2017 Torneo de Promoción y Reserva
 2017 Peruvian Segunda División
 2017 Copa Perú

References

External links
  
Tournament regulations 
Torneo Descentralizado news at Peru.com 
Torneo Descentralizado statistics and news at Dechalaca.com 

2017
2017 in Peruvian football
2017 in South American football leagues